Daphne tripartita is a shrub of the family Thymelaeaceae. It is native to China, specifically Southwest Sichuan and Northwest Yunnan.

Description
The shrub is evergreen. It has purplish and brownish branches that are smooth and stout. It is often found on boulders in forests at altitudes of 2700 to 3000 m above sea level.

References

tripartita